The Progressive Canadian Party (PC Party) was a minor centre-right federal political party in Canada. It was registered with Elections Canada, the government's election agency, on March 29, 2004.

Under provisions of the Canada Elections Act that took effect on May 14, 2004, parties were only required to nominate one candidate in order to qualify for official party status in the June 28, 2004 federal election. This meant that Progressive Canadian Party candidates were listed on the ballot alongside the party's name, rather than being designated as independents.

The party was deregistered by the Chief Electoral Officer of Canada on November 30, 2019, for failing to comply with Canada Elections Act requirements set out in subsection 415(1).

Founding and 2004 election

Following the dissolution of the Progressive Conservative Party of Canada and its merger with the Canadian Alliance into the new Conservative Party of Canada, the Progressive Canadian Party was formed by "Red Tories" who opposed the merger. One of the organizers, Joe Hueglin, is a former Progressive Conservative Member of Parliament (MP) from Niagara Falls, Ontario.

In announcing the new party, Hueglin stated that the party had about a dozen potential candidates and a mailing list of 330 names.  The party nominated 16 candidates for the 2004 general election, mostly in southern Ontario and Nova Scotia.

The party held a national convention in 2005 to select a leader and to develop policies. It has also established the "Macdonald-Cartier PC Fund" to raise money for the party, under the direction of Sinclair Stevens, a cabinet minister in the Progressive Conservative government of Brian Mulroney.

On November 17, 2005, the Federal Court of Appeal rejected Stevens' lawsuit to force Chief Electoral Officer Jean-Pierre Kingsley to rescind recognition of the merger of the Progressive Conservative Party with the Canadian Alliance. The court did rule, however, that Kingsley erred in not waiting 30 days to register the merger.  Stevens appealed the ruling to the Supreme Court of Canada, but that court announced on April 27, 2006, that it would not hear the appeal. The court gave no reason for its decision.

2006 election

Founding party leader Ernie Schreiber resigned in 2005 because of a heart condition. The party appointed Tracy Parsons as his successor. The party nominated 25 candidates for the 2006 federal election. Former Progressive Conservative cabinet minister and leadership candidate Heward Grafftey stood as a candidate for the party during that election. (See also: Progressive Canadian Party candidates, 2006 Canadian federal election.)

2011 election

2015 election

In the 2015 election, the party ran eight candidates, none of whom were elected with five getting the fewest votes in their riding.

Platform and goals

The new PC Party aims to be the successor to the former Progressive Conservative Party.  A few prominent figures are associated with this new party (Stevens and Heward Grafftey).  David Orchard, a fervent opponent of the merger of the Progressive Conservative Party of Canada and the Canadian Alliance, made no official statement about the new party. During the 2006 election, Orchard endorsed and later joined the Liberal Party.

The party adopted the last policy platform of the Progressive Conservative party, but has begun to create new policies for Canada to meet new situations and challenges.  These platforms include (but are not limited to), support of the Canadian Wheat Board, support for small business, belief in a single tier health-care system, the promise of eliminating student debt, and a foreign policy that emphasizes Canada's dual role of peace-keepers and diplomats.  The new party's official logo and initials are an homage to the Progressive Conservative Party, from where the party claims to draw its history, policy, and constitution.

Seven Pillars for Prosperity
According to the party's website, the Progressive Canadian Party has "seven pillars for bringing prosperity to Canada". These seven pillars are:
 "Facilitating post-secondary education"
 "Realizing growth opportunities"
 "Harnessing renewable resources"
 "Meeting differing needs"
 "Serving the world"
 "Allying for peace and stability"
 "Bringing new hope"

Election results

Eligibility: March 29, 2004
Short-form name: PC Party
Party leader: Hon. Sinclair Stevens, P.C.
President: Dorian Baxter
National co-ordinator: Joe Hueglin
Chief agent: Macdonald Cartier PC Fund
Auditor: Ben Seto, C.A.

PC Party leaders

See also
List of political parties in Canada
Red Tory

References

External links
Progressive Canadian Party – Canadian Political Parties and Political Interest Groups - Web Archive created by the University of Toronto Libraries

Political parties established in 2004
Political parties disestablished in 2019
2004 establishments in Canada
2019 disestablishments in Canada
Federal political parties in Canada
Conservative parties in Canada
Organizations based in Ottawa